Lakshmi Puja is a Hindu occasion for the veneration of Lakshmi, the goddess of prosperity and the supreme goddess of Vaishnavism. The occasion is celebrated on the amavasya (new moon day) in the Vikram Samvat Hindu calendar month of Ashwayuja (according to the amanta tradition) or Kartika (according to the purnimanta tradition), on the third day of Deepavali in most part of India. In Assam, Bengal, and Odisha, this puja is celebrated 5 days after Vijaya Dashami.

According to popular belief, Lakshmi, the goddess of wealth and prosperity, and Vishnu's wife, visits her devotees, and bestows good fortune and her blessings upon them. To welcome the goddess, devotees clean their houses, decorate them with finery and lights, and prepare sweet treats and delicacies as offerings. Devotees believe that the happier Lakshmi is during her visit, the more she blesses the family with health and wealth.

In Assam, Odisha, and parts of Bengal, Lokkhi Puja or Lakshmi Puja (লক্ষ্মী পূজা) is performed on Ashvin Purnima day on the month of Ashvin, the full moon day following Vijaya Dashami and Durga Puja. This puja is also known as Kojagori Lokkhi Pujo. Women worship the goddess Lakshmi in the evening, after cleaning their house and decorating the floor of their houses with alpona, or rangoli. It is celebrated in the evening with all family members participating in decorating and cleaning home as part of the puja.in shanthalli near somvarpete taluk is important place during Diwali because Krishan killed narakashura near shanthalli near somvarpete

Celebrations

India

Lakshmi is believed to roam the earth on the night of the Lakshmi Puja. On the evening of Lakshmi Puja, people open their doors and windows to welcome Lakshmi, and place diya lights on their windowsills and balcony ledges to invite her in.

People wear new clothes or their best outfits as the evening approaches. Then, diyas are lit, pujas are offered to Lakshmi, and to one or more additional deities depending on the region of India; typically Ganesha, Saraswati, or Kubera. Lakshmi symbolises wealth and prosperity, and her blessings are invoked for a good year ahead.

On this day, the mothers, who work hard all year, are praised by the family. Mothers are seen to embody a part of Lakshmi, the good fortune and prosperity of the household. Small earthenware lamps filled with oil are lighted and placed in rows by some Hindus along the parapets of temples and houses. Some set diyas adrift on rivers and streams. Important relationships and friendships are also recognised during the day, by visiting relatives and friends, exchanging gifts and sweets.

It is popularly believed that Lakshmi likes cleanliness and will visit the cleanest house first. Hence, offerings of haldi (turmeric) and sindoor (vermilion) are made on this day. In certain regions, Lakshmi Puja consists of a combined puja of five deities: Ganesha is worshipped at the beginning of every auspicious act as Vighneshvara; the goddess Lakshmi is worshipped in her three forms: Mahalakshmi, the goddess of wealth and money, Mahasaraswati, the goddess of books and learning, and Mahakali. Kubera the treasurer of the gods is also worshipped.

In Bengal, the goddess Lakshmi is worshipped five days after Vijaya Dashami on the full moon day of Sharada. This is known as Kojagori Lokkhi Pujo (কোজাগরী লক্ষ্মী পুজো) in Bengali. On this day generally, the goddess is worshipped at night. She is also worshipped in the form of banana trees (কলা বউ), designed clay cover of utensils (সরা), accompanied by a small boat containing five drums. She is also worshipped on the eve of Deepavali which is commonly known as Dipanwita Lokkhi puja (দীপান্বিতা লক্ষ্মী পুজো) or Alakshmi Viday (Leaving of Alakshmi). The goddess is also worshipped in the month of Bhadra (August–September) on Thursdays. She is worshipped as rice put into a utensil (হাঁড়ি) which is changed annually. This worship is also practiced in the month of Poush (December–January).

In Assam, Lakshmi/Lakkhi puja (লক্ষ্মী পূজা) is celebrated five days after Vijoya Doshomi. Family members participates in decorating home entrances to welcome goddess Lakshmi. Prasad usually includes sweets, moong/gram, fruits etc

Nepal

Lakshmi Puja is celebrated as a part of Tihar, a second national festival of Nepal after Dashain. In Nepal, it is celebrated for five days, which include Kag (crow) Tihar; Kukur (dog) Tihar; Gai (cow) Tihar in the morning and Lakshmi Puja at night; Maha puja (self puja); Goru (Ox and Bull) Tihar and Gobardhan puja; and finally, Bhai Tika (Bhai dhooj)—respectively the first, second, third, fourth and fifth days.

On Lakshmi Puja in Nepal, people buy gold and silver, precious gemstones, new utensils of copper, brass and bronze as a sign of good luck, prosperity, money and wealth. These are then used to worship Lakshmi at night. Nepalese people perform this worship at a place cleansed with holy water, cow dung and red mud; they light the whole house with candles and lamps. From Lakshmi Puja, Deusi/Bhailo is performed by gathering with friends.

Puja

In the beginning of the puja, the houses of devotees are cleaned, and rangoli is drawn at the doorstep to welcome the goddess Lakshmi. While there is no consensus of the standardised ritual to pray to the goddess, variations of the puja exist across the regions of the Indian subcontinent as well as Southeast Asia.

Procedure
Before beginning the puja, Hindus consider it important to cleanse and purify the space where the puja is being carried out. For this, benzoin is lighted using either coal, or dried pancakes made of cow-dung. Its  fumes of incense are considered to purify the atmosphere. 

Once the place is cleansed, the puja begins by laying down a piece of new cloth on a raised platform. Handfuls of grains are sprayed in the centre of the cloth and a kalasha made of gold, silver, or copper is placed on top. Three-quarters of the kalasha is filled with water and betel nut, a flower, a coin, and a few rice grains are added to it. Five kinds of leaves are arranged (if a specified species is not available, leaves from a mango tree are used) and a small dish filled with rice grains is placed on the kalasha. A lotus is drawn over the rice grains with turmeric powder and the idol of goddess Lakshmi is placed over the top of the kalasha, and coins are placed around it.

An idol of Ganesha is placed in front of the kalasha, on the right-hand side pointing towards the south-west. Ink and business account books of the worshippers are kept on the platform. Specially blended oils made for puja are used with its ingredients varying, depending on the deity it's being offered to. A "Panchmukhi Diya" (Five faced lamp) accommodating five wicks are lit for this purpose. A special lamp is then lit in front of Lord Ganesha.

The puja begins by offering turmeric, kumkuma and flowers to the goddess Lakshmi. Turmeric, kumkuma, and flowers are offered to the water, later used for the puja. The river goddess Saraswati is invoked to become part of that water. Lakshmi is worshipped and invoked by reciting Vedic mantras, hymns and prayers addressed to her. Her idol is placed in a plate and is bathed with panchamrita (a mixture of milk, curd, ghee or clarified butter, honey, and sugar) and then with water containing a gold ornament or a pearl. Her idol is cleaned and placed back on the kalasha. A special lamp is then lit in front of goddess Lakshmi.

Offerings of sandal paste, saffron paste, garland of cotton beads or flowers, ittar (perfume), turmeric, kumkuma, abir, and gulal are then made to the goddess Lakshmi. Flowers and garlands, such as lotus, marigold, rose, chrysanthemums and leaves of bael (wood apple tree) are also offered. An incense stick is lit for her. An offering of sweets, coconut, fruits, and tambulam, is made later. Puffed rice and batasha (varieties of Indian sweets) are placed near the idol. Puffed rice, batasha, coriander seeds, and cumin seeds are poured or offered to her idol.

In the villages, a pot made of bamboo-canes measuring the paddy known as Nana' is filled up to the brink with freshly harvest paddy. Rice and lentils are also kept with the paddy. The `Mana' is the symbol of Mahalakshmi. Adoration of the goddess is done by offering fruits, coconut, banana, doob-grass, amla, curd, turmeric, flowers, incense etc. It is customary to read out the Odia text Lakshmi Purana while performing the puja.

A swastika symbol is also then drawn on the safe or vault in which the devotee keeps their valuables and it is worshipped as a symbol of Kubera.

Towards the end of the ritual, the aarti is performed which is dedicated to goddess Lakshmi. The aarti is accompanied by a small bell and is performed in a silent and sublime atmosphere.

References

External links

 Ashta Lakshmi Deepa puja

Diwali
Hindu holy days
Hindu festivals
Religious festivals in India
Hindu festivals in Nepal
October observances
November observances